The Camfil Group is a producer and developer of air filters and clean air products. Camfil is also a global air filtration specialist with 24 production units and R&D centres in four countries in the Americas, Europe and the Asia-Pacific region. 

The Group, headquartered in Stockholm, Sweden, has approximately 4,500 employees and sales in the range of SEK 8 billion. International markets account for more than 90 percent of sales. The company's business is to provide customers with air filtration products and services within four main segments: Comfort Air, Clean Processes, Power Systems and Safety & Protection.

Camfil filtration devices helps prevent the spread of COVID-19 as they are frequently used in pharmaceutical clean-rooms, biosafety laboratories, and hospitals.

History 
Camfil was founded in Trosa in 1963 by the Larson family, still one of the company's principal owners, as a joint venture with Cambridge Filtration Corporation in the United States. In 1983, the family bought Cambridge's shares. Camfil was wholly owned by the family until 2000, when Ratos AB, a Swedish private equity company, received 29.7 percent of the shares in connection with the acquisition of Farr in the United States, which was then listed on NASDAQ. Ratos sold its shares in 2010 to the other owners, families Larson and Markman.

References

Manufacturing companies of Sweden
Companies based in Stockholm
Cleanroom technology